Jalal Matini (born 1928) is a scholar of Persian literature, particularly renowned for his expertise on the epic Shahnameh by Ferdowsi, and contemporary Iranian studies.  He is also known for producing the critical edition of the Kush Nama.

Prior to the 1979 Iranian revolution, Dr Matini was a professor and president of the Ferdowsi University of Mashhad (Iran). After emigrating to the United States, Matini taught Persian literature at the University of California, Berkeley and at Harvard University, and founded the journals "Iran-Nameh" and Iran-Shenasi.

Works

Books

Other Publications/Articles
Virtually all of Jalal Matini's work are in Persian but he has also written some English articles.
J. Matini, "Kush-Nama" in Mahmoud Omidsalar (Author), A. Tafazzoli (Editor), Touraj Daryaee  "The Spirit of Wisdom: Menog I Xrad : Essays in Memory of Ahmad Tafazzoli",Mazda Publishers (September 2003).
J. Matini, "ĀFARĪN-NĀMA" in Encyclopædia Iranica 
J. Matini, "HEDĀYAT AL-MOTAʿALLEMIN FI’L-ṬEBB" in Encyclopædia Iranica 
J. Matini, "ʿAMĀRA MARVAZĪ" in Encyclopædia Iranica 
J. Matini, "AFIFI, RAḤIM" in Encyclopædia Iranica 
J. Matini, "ADĪB NĪŠĀBURĪ" in Encyclopædia Iranica 
J. Matini, "ʿAMʿAQ BOḴARĀʾĪ" in Encyclopædia Iranica 
J. Matini, "ḤABIB-ALLĀH ḴORĀSĀNI" in Encyclopædia Iranica 
J. Matini, "BAHMANYĀR AḤMAD" in Encyclopædia Iranica 
J. Matini, "FAYYĀŻ, ʿALĪ-AKBAR MAJĪDĪ" in Encyclopædia Iranica 
J. Matini, "FARROḴ, Sayyed MAḤMŪD" in Encyclopædia Iranica 
J. Matini, "AYĀZ, ABU’L-NAJM" in Encyclopædia Iranica 
J. Matini, "ĀẔAR BĪGDELĪ" in Encyclopædia Iranica 
J. Matīnī, "ʿAWFĪ, SADĪD-AL-DĪN" in Encyclopædia Iranica 
J. Matini, "KUŠ-NĀMA" in Encyclopædia Iranica 
J. Matīnī, M. Caton, "ʿĀREF QAZVĪNĪ" in Encyclopædia Iranica

See also
 Iran Shenasi
 Iranian studies

References

External links
 
 Books by Author, Jalal Matini

Iranian literary scholars
Iranian writers
Living people
Iranologists
1928 births
Iranian emigrants to the United States
University of California, Berkeley faculty
Harvard University faculty